Ponte de Vilela is a medieval bridge in Portugal. It is located in Arcos de Valdevez, Viana do Castelo District.

See also
List of bridges in Portugal

Bridges in Viana do Castelo District
Arcos de Valdevez
Properties of Public Interest in Portugal
Listed bridges in Portugal